Arak (Arâk) is the capital of Markazi Province, Iran. At the 2011 census, its population was 526,182, in 160,761 families. The city is nicknamed the "Industrial Capital of Iran".

As a major industrial city, Arak hosts several industrial factories inside and within a few kilometers outside the city, including the factory of Machine Sazi Arak and the Iranian Aluminium Company. These factories produce nearly half of the needs of the country in steel, petrochemical, and locomotive industries.

Etymology

Arâk
The term Arâk remains from a name given to the region since the medieval period. It derives from Arabic al-ʿIrāq, meaning "root", itself derived possibly from Akkadian Uruk (Erech). But new research has shown that the word Arak has the same roots with the words Iran and Arran, and the name Iraq is an Arabicized Persian word.

During the Seljuk era, a region comprising the whole territory of Media (northwestern Iran) and the lower part of Mesopotamia was referred to as Iraq; with the Median part called ʿErâq-e ʿAjam ("Iraq of the Ajam [non-Arabic speakers]"), and the Mesopotamian part called ʿErâq-e ʿArab ("Iraq of the Arab").

Soltân Âbâd
The term Soltân Âbâd is a Persian compound word.

Soltân, deriving from Arabic sulṭān ("power", "authority"), is a Near Eastern noble title given to a powerful governor. Modern Persian âbâd, meaning "settlement" or "abode", derives from Middle Persian āpāt ("populous"). However, according to linguist Sasha Lubotsky, the Persian term ābād might derive from Proto-Iranian *āpāta ("protected"), rooting from Proto-Indo-European *peh₂- ("to protect").

History

Originally named Soltan Abad, the modern-day city of Arak was founded in 1808 by Yusef Khan-e Gorji, a pro-Iranian warlord of Georgian Muslim origin who was given refuge by Qajar ruler Agha Mohammad Khan following a territorial dispute with his cousins, who were supported by Russian empress Catherine the Great.

Between 1795 and 1797, Yusef Khan-e Gorji, renamed Yusef Khan-e Sepahdar by the Qajar ruler, settled his army in the fertile but poorly-controlled territory that would become the modern-day Arak. Hostile tribes in the region had operated autonomously from the Qajar rule. With the Shah's approval, Yusef Khan diverted the main river to drive out the hostiles and build the war fortress of Soltan Abad to act as a buffer.

According to early modern historians, Yusef Khan built the city with the aid of effluents. Until 1892, the town remained a military base and fortress. The fortress of Soltan Abad had a thick wall surrounded by 7-meter-deep moats. Eight towers were constructed around the town and the governmental building was established in its northern part.

In 1891, shops, gardens, and government buildings of Soltan Abad were repaired by the order of deputy governor Mirza Hasan (Etemad os-Saltane). Large parts of the city were formerly annexed as personal property to the pre-existing army commanders, and were then ultimately turned over to the state around 1918–1922.

Beginning by the last quarter of the 19th century, the city achieved major developments in carpet industry, and eventually became Iran's most important center of carpet production for export markets, continuing up until at least 1940.

Under the reign of Reza Shah of the Pahlavi dynasty, the city was renamed Arak. Modern factories for vegetable oil, soap, sugar beet, and wool industries were established within the city. Arak also became an important station for the Trans-Iranian Railway, a major railway project directed by Reza Shah which was completed in 1938.

In 1972, two major state-owned enterprises were established in the city, including an aluminum smelter and a heavy engineering plant. The aluminum smelter was built under the Regional Cooperation for Development project of the Central Treaty Organization, in cooperation with the company of Reynolds and Reynolds. The engineering plant was processed with equipment and technical advice from the Soviets, in return of gas sales to the Soviet Union.

The city officially became a metropolis on April 6, 2013, after the merger with Karahrud and Senjan. In 2017 a man shot dead seven members of his wife's family in a mass shooting and attempted murder–suicide.

Geography
Arak is surrounded by mountains in the south, west, and east, and its average altitude is about 1750m above sea level. It is located 260 km from the city of Tehran, and is in the vicinity of the cities of Qom and Isfahan.

Climate
Arak has a hot-summer mediterranean continental climate (Köppen: Dsa, Trewartha: Dc), that is, in general, relatively cold and dry.

The weather of the city is hot and dry in summer, windy and cool in autumn, cold and snowy in winter, and mild in spring. Its maximum temperature may raise up to 35 degrees Celsius in summer and fall to below -25 degrees Celsius in winter. The average rainfall is around 350mm and the annual relative humidity is 46%.

Transport

Airport

Arak is served by the International Airport of Arak, which is located north of the city. The airport was opened in 1938, and is one of the oldest airports of Iran.

Rail
The railway system of Arak was connected to the Iranian Railways in 1935. Destinations stretch directly from Bandar-e-Shapur in the southwestern Iran to Bandar-e-Torkman under the Caspian Sea.

High-speed rail 
Arak–Qom High Speed Rail is the second high-speed rail project in Iran which will have a junction with Tehran–Qom–Isfahan High Speed Rail at one of the stations in Qom province. The Islamic Republic of Iran Railways signed a €1.2 billion deal with its Italian counterpart for establishing a high-speed railroad between the Iranian cities of Qom and Arak. Iran decided to delegate the project to the Chinese following the withdrawal of an Italian firm due to US sanctions on Iran. This new High Speed Line, part of the Iran National Railway Network, will be a double track passenger railway line and will have an operational speed of 300 km/h.

Public transportation
Buses provide the bulk of the local public transport in Arak.

Industry
Arak is one of industrial cities of Iran, that in terms of diversity is the 1st, in terms of heavy industries is the 2nd and totally is one of four industrial hubs of Iran. This city because of the heavy industries, manufacturing 80% of Iran energy equipment, the largest Iranian Machinery company (MSA), the largest heavy equipment manufacturer in the Middle East, the largest locomotive and wagon manufacturer in the Middle East, the largest Aluminum company in Iran, the largest crane manufacturer in the Middle East, Iran's largest mineral company and the largest combine manufacturer in the Middle East; nicknamed the Industrial Capital of Iran.

Arak has chemical, construction, energy, food, machinery, metal, mining, textile, petroleum and petrochemical Industries that some of those are between basic industries of Iran.

The following are a number of important industrial factories based in Arak.

Machine Sazi Arak
AzarAb Industries
Wagon Pars (Locomotive and Train manufacturer)
Iranian Aluminium Company (IRALCO)
HEPCO (Heavy Equipment Production Company)
Avangan
Navard Aluminium
Iran Combine Manufacturing Company
Lajvar Industrial Group (Crane manufacturer)
 Arak Petrochemical Company
Arak Oil Refinery
Heavy Water Production Plant of Arak

Agriculture and handicrafts
The main agricultural products of the city are grain, barley, and fruits including grape, apple, walnut, and almond. Arak also exports hand-knotted carpets which are referred to as Sarouk rugs. Saruq is a small village outside Arak, and its name is used in order to prevent confusion with rug from the modern-day country of Iraq.

Main sites

Parks and gardens
 Nezam Lashgar Garden (Garden of Esmaeili)
 City Park
 Amir Kabir Park
 Jangali Park
 Kelale Mountain Park
 Arak Zoo
 Madar Park

Museums
 Soltan Abad Museum
 Four Seasons Bathroom
 Museum of Artifacts (Hassan Pour Museum)
 Museum of Famous Figures (The Hall of Fame of Arak)
 Grand Museum of Arak

Sports complexes

 Amir Kabir Entertainment and Sports Complex
 Tufan Entertainment and Sports Complex
 Shahin Horse Riding Complex

Universities
 Arak University
 Arak University of Medical Sciences
 Arak University of Technology 
 Azad University of Arak 
 Payam-e-Noor University of Arak
 Kharazmi University of Arak

Other
 The old bazaar of Arak
 Doab Bridge (built over the Shara River)
 Mostowfi Mansion
 Gerdoo Valley (known for its walnut trees and ranges)

Notable people

Statesmen and politicians:
 Sharaf Khan Bidlisi (1543-ca. 1600), Kurdish historian and prince of Bitlis, was born in Karahrūd, Arak.
 Ghaem Magham Farahani (1779–1835), a former Prime Minister of Iran, was born in Farahan District, Arak.
 Amir Kabir (1807–1852), a former Prime Minister of Iran, was born in Hezaveh District, Arak.
 Mohammad Mosaddegh (1882–1967), a former Prime Minister of Iran, was born in Tehran. His father was from Ashtiyan, northeastern Arak.
 Morteza-Qoli Bayat (1890–1958), a former Prime Minister of Iran (1944–1945).
 Ata'ollah Mohajerani (1954–), one of the ministers of the cabinet of Mohammad Khatami.

Literary, painting, and photography figures:
 Sonia Balassanian (born 1942), Iranian-born Armenian painter, curator, sculptor
 Parvin E'tesami (1907–1941), Iranian poet, was born in Tabriz. Her father was from Ashtiyan, northeastern Arak.
 Behjat Sadr (1924–2009), an eminent Iranian painter.
 Jahangir Razmi (1947–), the 1980 Pulitzer Prize winner (photographer).
 Kader Abdolah (1954–), an Iranian-Dutch poet laureate.

Sportsmen:
 Mansour Bahrami (1956–), an Iranian tennis player.
 Mehdi Mahdavikia (1977–), a famous Iranian football player.

Scientists:
Mohammad Gharib (1909–1975), an Iranian physician, clinician.
Wahid Shams Kolahi (1965–), an electrical engineer.

Singers:

 Ebrahim Hamedi (Ebi) (1949–), an Iranian singer; his father was from Arak.

Cinema and television artists:
 Yervand Manaryan (1924–2020), an Iranian-Armenian actor.
 Reza Badiyi (1930–2011), director of episodes of many popular American television series, including Hawaii Five-O, Mission: Impossible, The Incredible Hulk, The Six Million Dollar Man, Falcon Crest, Buffy the Vampire Slayer (the episode Out of Mind, Out of Sight), Nikita, etc.
 Pouri Banayi, (1940–), a famous Iranian actress before the 1979 Revolution (1965–1979).
 Golchehreh Sajadiye (1954–), an Iranian actress.
 Manijeh Hekmat (1962–), an Iranian film director.
 Mostafa Azizi (1962–), an Iranian TV producer.
Mehran Modiri (1967–), an Iranian actor, director and comedian; his father and his mother were from Arak.
 Bahareh Rahnama (1973–), an Iranian actress.
 Sahar Zakaria (1973–), an Iranian actress.
 Pegah Ahangarani (1984–), an Iranian actress.

See also

 List of cities in Iran
 List of cities, towns and villages in Markazi Province

References

External links

 
Populated places in Arak County
Cities in Markazi Province
Iranian provincial capitals